Eidophasia is a genus of moths in the family Plutellidae.

Species
Eidophasia albidorsella (Walsingham, 1881)
 Eidophasia albifasciata Issiki, 1931
Eidophasia assmanni Huemer & Sohn, 2020
 Eidophasia dammersi (Busck, 1934)
Eidophasia hufnagelii (Zeller, 1839)
Eidophasia infuscata Staudinger, 1870
 Eidophasia insulella Walsingham, 1900
 Eidophasia messingiella (Fischer von Röslerstamm, 1840)
Eidophasia peristigma Diakonoff, 1955
 Eidophasia syenitella Herrich-Schäffer, 1854
Eidophasia tauricella Staudinger, 1880
 Eidophasia vanella (Walsingham, 1881)
Eidophasia zukowskyi Amsel, 1939

External links
Eidophasia at funet
Eidophasia assmanni sp. nov., the first alpine representative of the genus, detected in the Russian Altai Mountains (Lepidoptera, Plutellidae)

Plutellidae